Allan is both a given name and an English and Scottish surname.

People with the given name

A–F
 Allan (footballer, born 1991), Brazilian footballer
 Allan (footballer, born 1997), Brazilian footballer
 Allan Abbass (born 1962), a professor, psychiatrist, and founding Director of the Centre for Emotions and Health at Dalhousie University in Halifax, Canada
 Allan Ackerman, an American magician who specializes in sleight of hand magic with playing cards
 Allan Adair (1897–1988), a senior officer of the British Army who served in both World Wars
 Allan Adler (1916–2002), an American silversmith
 Allan Agar (born 1949), an English rugby league footballer and coach
 Allan Ahlberg (born 1938), British children's book writer with his wife Janet Ahlberg as illustrator
 Allan Alaalatoa (born 1994), an Australian rugby union player
 Allan Alaküla (born 1968), an Estonian journalist
 Allan Albert (1945–1994), an American director, producer, and playwright
 Allan Alcorn (born 1948), an American pioneering engineer and computer scientist
 Allan Alemán (born 1983), a Costa Rican professional football player
 Allan Amato (born 1974), an American portrait photographer and film director
 Allan Amin, an Indian action film director
 Allan Anderson (disambiguation)
 Allan Andrews (disambiguation)
 Allan Antliff, an anarchist activist, art critic and author
 Allan Arbus (1918–2013), an American actor and photographer
 Allan Arkush (born 1948), an American film and television director
 Allan Armitage (born 1946), a professor of horticulture at the University of Georgia, United States
 Allan Ashbolt (1921–2005), an Australian journalist and television broadcaster
 Allan Asher (born 1951), an Australian lawyer, consumer advocate and campaigner
 Allan Ayala (born 1986), a track and field athlete from Guatemala
 Allan Aynesworth (1864–1959), the stage name of British actor Edward Abbot-Anderson
 Allan Baillie (born 1943), an Australian writer
 Allan Baker, a notorious Australian rapist and murderer
 Allan Bakke (born 1940), party in the landmark 1978 U.S. Supreme Court decision Regents of the University of California v. Bakke
 Allan Baldwin (1924–2008), an Australian rules footballer
 Allan Ball (1943–2018), an English former footballer
 Allan Boesak (born 1946), a South African cleric, politician and anti-apartheid activist
 Allan B. Calhamer (1931–2013), an American mail carrier who invented the board game Diplomacy
 Allan Anthony Costly (born 1954), a Honduran former footballer
 Allan A. Davidson (fl. 1840–1899), a lawyer and political figure in New Brunswick, Canada
 Allan de San Miguel (born 1988), Australian professional baseball player
 Allan Dokossi (born 1999), Central African basketball player
 Allan Donald (born 1966), a former South African cricketer
 Allan Dwan (1885–1981), Canadian-American film director
 Allan Mackay Findlay, British geographer

G–Z
 Allan George (born 1999), American football player
 Allan A. Goldstein (born 1949), an American film director and screenwriter
 Allan Holdsworth (1946–2017), English guitarist and composer
 Allan Houston (born 1971), American basketball player
 Allan B. Hubbard (born 1947), American economic advisor to George W. Bush
 Allan Jay (born 1931), British world champion épée & foil fencer
 Allan Jones (cricketer) (born 1947), an English cricket umpire and a retired cricketer
 Allan K. (born 1958), Filipino actor, comedian, and TV host
 Allan Kimbaloula (born 1992), a Congolese international footballer
 Allan Kozinn (born 1954), American music critic
 Allan Kwartler (1917–1998), American sabre and foil fencer, Pan American Games and Maccabiah Games champion
 Allan A. Lamport (1903–1999), mayor of Toronto, Canada
 Allan Lane (1909–1973), an American film star of cowboy B-movies in the 1940s and 1950s
 Allan B. Magruder (1775–1822), a United States Senator from Louisiana
 Allan McCollum (born 1944), American artist
 Allan Morris (born 1940), a former Australian politician
 Allan A. Moss (1854–1929), mayor of Newport News, Virginia, United States
 Allan Alfred Nunweiler (born 1930), a Canadian former politician, also known as Alf Nunweiler
 Allan Nyom (born 1988), a Cameroonian professional footballer
 Allan Arenfeldt Olesen (born 1982), a Danish professional football player
 Allan Pickard (1895–1975), Canadian ice hockey administrator
 Allan Ray (born 1984), American professional basketball player
 Allan A. Ryan Jr. (1903–1981), an American financier and politician from New York
 Allan A. Schoenherr (1937–2021), a Californian author, ecologist, and naturalist
 Allan Sherman (1924–1973), an American comedy writer and singer
 Allan Morley Spaar (1876-1960), Sri Lankan public servant and politician, served as second Mayor of Kandy
 Allan "Whitey" Snyder (1914–1994), an American Hollywood make-up artist
 Allan Starski (born 1943), a Polish Academy Award-winning production designer and set decorator
 Allan Sutter (1914–1988), American Marine Corps Navy Cross recipient
 Allan A. Swenson (born 1933), an author, literary agent and master gardener
 Allan B. Swift (1935–2018), an Emmy award-winning broadcaster and American politician
 Lord Allan Jay Velasco (born 1977), Filipino politician
 Allan Wallenius (1890–1942), Swedish leftist figure and journalist 
 Allan B. Walsh (1874–1953), an American politician from New Jersey
 Allan Arthur Willman (1909–1989), an American classical pianist, composer, music pedagog
 Allan Zebie (born 1993), Canadian soccer player

People with the surname
 Alexander Allan (disambiguation)
 Anthony Allan (disambiguation)
 Charlie Allan (disambiguation)
 Davie Allan, American guitarist
 Deborah Allen (born 1975), British judoka
 Denis Allan (born 1944), Canadian chess master                           
 Fabian Allen (born 1995), Jamaican cricketer                                     
 Freya Allan  (born 2001), English actress                                                
 Gary Allan  (born 1967), American country music singer and songwriter
 George Allan (disambiguation)
 Griselda Allan (1905–1987), British artist
 Henry Allan (disambiguation)
 Harry Allan (1882–1957), New Zealand botanist 
 Hugh Allan (1810–1882), Scottish-Canadian shipping magnate
 Ian Allan (publisher) (1922–2015), British publisher
 Jack Allan (disambiguation)
 James Allan (disambiguation)
 Jed Allan (1935–2019), American actor
 Jim Allan (disambiguation)
 Jimmy Allan (disambiguation)
 John Allan (disambiguation)
 Joyce Allan (1896–1966), Australian conchologist
 Keith Allan (disambiguation)
 Lewis Allan (1903–1986), pseudonym of American lyricist Abel Meeropol
 Lucy Allan (disambiguation)
 Marcus Allan (born 1986), Australian rules footballer
 Mary Parsons Reid Allan (1917–2002), Scottish artist  
 Mea Allan (1909–1982), Scottish journalist
 Patrick Allan, Scottish footballer
 Peter Allan (disambiguation)
 Philip Bertram Murray Allan (1884–1973), British writer
 Ray Allan (born 1955), Scottish footballer
 Robert Allan (disambiguation)
 Rosemary Allan (1911–2008), British artist
 Sandy Allan (born 1947), Scottish footballer
 Thomas Allan (disambiguation)
 William Allan (disambiguation)

Fictional characters
 Allan (mascot), a former mascot of the Baltimore Ravens football team
 Allan Christie, a character in Diana Gabaldon's Outlander book series and its TV adaptation
 Allan Thompson (comics), a fictional character from The Adventures of Tintin by Hergé
 Allan-a-Dale, a variant spelling of Alan-a-Dale, a figure in the Robin Hood legend
 Zack Allan, a fictional character from the television series Babylon 5

See also
Alan (given name)
List of people with given name Alan
Allen (given name)
Alan (surname)
Allen (surname)

English-language surnames
Scottish surnames
Scottish masculine given names
English masculine given names
Surnames from given names